The 1988–89 Duke Blue Devils men's basketball team represented Duke University. The head coach was Mike Krzyzewski. The team played its home games in the Cameron Indoor Stadium in Durham, North Carolina, and was a member of the Atlantic Coast Conference.

Roster

Schedule

|-
!colspan=9 style=| Regular season

|-
!colspan=12 style=| ACC Tournament

|-
!colspan=12 style=| NCAA tournament

Awards and honors
Danny Ferry, USBWA College Player of the Year
Mike Krzyzewski, ACC Coach of the Year
Mike Krzyzewski, Naismith College Coach of the Year

Team players drafted into the NBA

References

Duke
Duke Blue Devils men's basketball seasons
NCAA Division I men's basketball tournament Final Four seasons
Duke
Duke Blue Devils men's basketball
Duke Blue Devils men's basketball